Juan Ignacio Surraco Lamé (born 14 August 1987) is a Uruguayan professional football midfielder for A.C. Prato.

Club career
Surraco was born in Montevideo, Uruguay, and at an early age decided to dedicate himself to sports. He was scouted at fifteen by Central Español, where he began his professional career in 2006.

In 2006, he was signed by Italian club Udinese.

In August 2007 he went on loan to Italian Serie B team F.C. Messina.

In March 2015, he returned to his native country to play for El Tanque Sisley.

In August 2015, he was signed by Italian club U.S. Lecce. He scored 6 goals in 28 Lega Pro matches.

In July 2016 he was signed by Serie B side Ternana with a one-year deal. He made 14 appearances in Serie B before moving to FeralpiSalò on 25 January 2017. He picked number 9 shirt.

Surraco joined A.C. Prato on 29 January 2019.

International career
His talent caught the attention of the team coach and he was soon a regular starter for the team in the Uruguayan football league. At the same time he also impressed scouts for the Uruguay national football team, though he would have to wait a few years and join the U-20 team after he turned eighteen.

On 23 June 2007, he suffered a knee trauma and his participation in the upcoming 2007 FIFA U-20 World Cup was at one point in doubt, but eventually he played with the Uruguayan U20 team which drew 2–2 against Spain, beat Jordan 1–0, lost 2–0 against Zambia, and was eliminated in the second round losing 2–1 against the United States of America. Like his team mates Cavani and Suárez, Surraco played in all these games except against Zambia.

References

External links
 
 

1987 births
Living people
Association football midfielders
Uruguayan footballers
Uruguay under-20 international footballers
Uruguayan expatriate footballers
Central Español players
Udinese Calcio players
A.C.R. Messina players
A.C. Ancona players
Torino F.C. players
Modena F.C. players
A.S. Cittadella players
El Tanque Sisley players
U.S. Lecce players
Ternana Calcio players
FeralpiSalò players
U.S. Pistoiese 1921 players
Serie B players
Serie C players
Expatriate footballers in Italy